"I Love You Yes I Do" is an October 1947 single by Bull Moose Jackson and his Buffalo Bearcats. The song was written by Henry Glover and Sally Nix.  The single was Jackson's first number one on the US Billboard R&B chart, spending three weeks at the top spot and peaking at number 24 on the pop chart.

1961 recording
In 1961, Bull Moose Jackson recorded a new version of the song without his band.  The new version hit number ten on the R&B chart, and number 98 on the Billboard Hot 100. Both versions of "I Love You Yes I Do" were the only times Jackson crossed over to the national pop chart.

Cover versions
James Brown recorded a cover version of the song in 1961 which failed to chart, though its B-side, "Just You and Me, Darling", charted number 17 on the R&B chart. He also performed the song in a medley with The Famous Flames on the 1963 album, Live at the Apollo.

References

Bull Moose Jackson songs
James Brown songs
1947 singles
1961 singles
Songs written by Henry Glover
1947 songs
King Records (United States) singles